Breen is an unincorporated community on the Southern Ute Indian Reservation in La Plata County, Colorado, United States.

History
A post office called Breen was established in 1901, and remained in operation until 1954. The community was named after Dr. Thomas Breen, a local educator.

See also

References

External links

Unincorporated communities in La Plata County, Colorado
Unincorporated communities in Colorado